Puketotara, or Puketōtara, is a rural community in the Otorohanga District and Waikato region of New Zealand's North Island.

Marae

Hīona Marae, a meeting place of the Ngāti Maniapoto hapū of Pourahui, is affiliated with Waikato Tainui.

It has two meeting houses: Haona Kaha and Te Awananui.

In October 2020, the Government committed $2,584,751 from the Provincial Growth Fund to upgrade the marae and 5 other Waikato Tainui marae, creating 69 jobs.

Education

The New Zealand Ministry for Culture and Heritage gives a translation of "big lips" for Ngutunui.

References

Ōtorohanga District
Populated places in Waikato